Gladys Hall (April 26, 1891, New York - Huntington, Long Island, September 18, 1977) was an American journalist. She began her career writing poetry and articles for fan magazines. She wrote a syndicated column, "The Diary of a Professional Movie Fan," in the 1920s, and interviewed movie stars for such fan magazines as Photoplay, Modern Screen, and ''Screenland. "The public", she once said, "don't want their stars torn down, they want to believe in them, like Santa Claus."

Hall married photographer Russell E. Ball on February 1, 1912, when she was twenty years old.

Her papers, which span the years 1918-1969 (bulk 1930-1941), are held at the Margaret Herrick Library of the Academy of Motion Picture Arts and Sciences. They consist primarily of notes and manuscripts for her articles on various movie stars. There is also a small amount of correspondence, as well as most of the fiction written by Hall.

References

1891 births
1977 deaths
American women journalists
20th-century American women writers
20th-century American journalists
People from Huntington, New York
Women film pioneers